Austrophorella quadrisignata is a species of beetle in the family Buprestidae, the only species in the genus Austrophorella.

References

Monotypic Buprestidae genera